St. Peter's School (formerly the European Boys' School) is a private all-boys boarding school located in the town of Panchgani in Satara, Maharashtra, India. Founded in 1902, it ranks among the top ten boarding schools in India. It is essentially a boarding school, but a few day scholars are also admitted.

School Crest

The crest of the school has—the mythical bird—the phoenix rising out of flames and holding an olive branch.

Its outstretched wings, in the crest of St. Peter's, is to signify the goals and spirit of the phoenix rising. It is a symbol of hope and rebirth and because of this the gods vowed—for as long as the phoenix lives, there is hope for mankind. The olive being carried in the phoenix's beak conveys that St. Peter's cherishes peace and harmony.

Motto

The motto of the school is Ut Prosim, which means "That I may serve" or "That I may be useful".

Houses

History

Origins

St. Peter's School, Panchgani (formerly known as the European Boys' School) was founded in 1902. The school was located at Kimmins School in its early stages. After receiving a generous donation from Miss Mary Ashlin (Lady Ashlin), the school was finally established in 1904 and moved to its own building (the current main school building) in 1904.

One landmark in the history of the school was the appointment of Mr. Oswald D Bason as Principal in 1947. He filled this position until his retirement in 1974. Another important change came about in 1967 when the management of the school passed into the hands of the Society of St. Peter's School, Panchgani.

Chronology

 1861 The earliest European settlers in Panchgani, under Mr. J. Chesson, opened negotiations with the Government for the purchase of land for a church and school.
 1876 Mr. Samuel Brierly, late Headmaster of Bishop's School, Poona, opened a Boarding and Day School at "Elstow", Panchgani.
 1891 The Diocesan Board of Education, Bombay, became interested and appointed the Rev. Burgess, Chaplain/Headmaster. School opened at "Preston", but closed soon after due to a lawsuit over the property.
 1895 The Rev. R. Evans, DD, was appointed by the Diocese to receive the School in "The Ark".
 1898 Kimmins Girls' School founded by Miss A. Emilie Kimmins. Boys and girls studied together.
 1902 Miss Mary Ashlin donated a legacy to the Colonial and Continental Church Society, London. The Society interested itself in the School at Panchgani and decided to govern the School with a Committee of Management at Bombay. Classes held in the nave of St. Peter's Church under the Rev. J. Redman. Boys housed at "Enfield" and "Albert House".
 1904 Boys' School separates from Kimmins School. Present school buildings opened by Richard Stanley Heywood, Bishop of Mombasa.
 1911 Assembly hall erected. Opened by Sir George Clark, Governor of Bombay.
 1914 Middle Dormitory built.
 1921 Rhodesia House and grounds purchased by the school. Death of Miss A. E. Kimmins, Founder of Kimmins Girls' School.
 1934 Reference library constructed.
 1937 Swimming bath constructed.
 1940 Junior class-rooms constructed.
 1947 Principal – Mr. O. D. Bason.
 1950 "Maycroft" equipped for use as a school hospital.
 1953 New kitchen built with financial assistance from the Sassoon David Trust.
 1954 The school celebrated its Golden Jubilee (1904–1954). The dining hall was opened by the Rt. Rev. W. Q. Lash, Bishop of Bombay and Chairman of the Board of Governors.
 1958 The "Albert House" estate was purchased at a cost of ₹75,000.
 1959 "Maycroft" was purchased at a cost of ₹25,000.
 1960 The school ceased to accept Government grants. "Flora House" was converted into a hostel. Gas was installed in the School kitchen.
 1961 Modern sanitation was installed in School House. The school passed from the management of the Commonwealth & Continental Church Society to that of the Bombay Diocesan Society. A tablet commemorating the change was erected in the Assembly Hall. Maycroft Cottage was demolished and rebuilt at a cost of ₹10,000.
 1962 Mr. J. L. Davis completed 25 years service at the school and was presented with a gold medal in appreciation of his services.
 1963 An appeal for funds towards the cost of a new building to celebrate the School's Diamond Jubilee was launched. Fire in Principal's house.
 1964 Work commenced on the new building. Estimated cost: ₹325,000. The School celebrated its Diamond Jubilee (1904–1964). The Rt. Rev. Christopher Robinson, Bishop of Bombay, unveiled a tablet to commemorate the occasion.
 1966 Jubilee Hall completed.
 1967 The Bombay Diocesan Trust Association hands over the management of St. Peter's School to the Society of St. Peter's School, Panchgani.
 1967 Earthquake rocks Panchgani. Maycroft, Hill View and part of the kitchen are razed to the ground.
 1969 Maycroft and Hill View cottages reconstructed while the kitchen is repaired.
 1974 Mr. O. D. Bason retires as principal after an innings of 27 years.
 1974 Bason Hall dormitory and staff quarters constructed.
 1975 Mr. Jack Timmins assumes the office of Principal.
 1975 The St. Peter's School, Panchgani, Old Boys' Association is formed.
 1980 Rhodesia renamed to Junior House on the Independence of Rhodesia.
 1980–1981 Lower Field Stadium embankment is constructed – work incomplete.
 1981 Mr. Timmins migrates to Australia and Mr. Morris W. Innis takes over as principal.
 1981 Last meeting of the Old Boys' Association.
 1985 Mr. Ainsley L. Edgar appointed Vice Principal in May.
 1986 Mr. O. D. Bason dies in Panchgani.
 1987 Mr. Ainsley Edgar compelled to resign as several students accused him of inappropriate behaviour towards them. Some ex students reported him for inappropriate touching during dormitory inspection and private meetings. Mr.Edgar resigned in November.
1987 Computer studies introduced in the school. 
 1989 Lawrence Villa purchased for ₹15 lakhs.
 1993 Ground floor of Junior School block constructed.
 1994 Latur earthquake rocks St. Peter's. Flora House and Albert House are badly damaged.
 2000 Mr. Innis retires as principal. Mr. K. A. Garman takes his place.
 2001 Mr. K. A. Garman resigns and Mr. R. Robinson takes his place.
 2002 Mr. R. Robinson resigns and Miss Gilbert is appointed honorary Principal. Assembly Hall burns to the ground.
 2003 Mr. Eugene Roscoe, vice Principal (April–September). Miss Gilbert (acting Principal) is succeeded by Mr. Gene Oscar Lee (junior school headmaster). The school could not appoint a Principal from 2001 to 2004 as Mr. K. A. Garman had taken the school to court over his unfair dismissal. In August 2003 Mr. Eugene Roscoe filed a case against the board of directors over his unfair dismissal and was awarded a massive sum of money in an out-of-court settlement.
 2004 Centenary celebrations.
 2005 New Assembly Hall dedicated.
 2006 January Vice-Principal Joe L. Davis (1968) dies at the age of 88.
 2007 Mr. G.O. Lee resigns as a Principal after 4 years
 2007 Mr. Desmond D'Monte assumes the office of Headmaster in March, 2007. The school scales new heights both in academics and co curricular activities. Mr. Desmond D'Monte resigns in January, 2009.
 2009 Mr. Niteen Salvi takes over as acting headmaster (offg. headmaster)
 2010 Dr. Thomas Charles Williams takes over as the new principal. Dr Thomas Charles Williams thrown out.
 2010 Mrs. Sangita James takes over as the new principal.
 2015 Mrs. Sangita James resigns as Principal after 5 years. Mr. Brian Robbins takes over as the principal.
 2016 Dr. Wilfred Noronha takes over as the new principal.

Notable alumni
 Freddie Mercury - singer, songwriter, record producer, and lead vocalist of the rock band Queen. 
 Akbar Al Baker - group chief executive officer, Qatar Airways.
 Anmol Vellani - Founder-Director of India Foundation for the Arts. Theatre director and writer. The UK PM Tony Blair credited him for his approach in politics.
 Derrick Branche - British film actor. 
 Sameer Iqbal Patel - Writer Director, Bollywood 
 Farid Amiri - Indian film actor.
 Neville Shah - stand-up comedian and writer.
Sorabh Pant - stand-up comedian and writer.
Udayanraje Bhonsle - current Chhatrapati, member, Rajya Sabha, former member, Lok Sabha.
 Victory Rana - Lt General (Retd.), Nepalese Army, also former Force Commander of the UN Peacekeeping Force in Cyprus.  Former Royal Nepalese Ambassador to Myanmar  
 Zul Vellani - Scriptwriter and commentator for over 700 Films Division of India's documentaries.

References

External links
Official website

Boys' schools in India
Schools in Maharashtra
Boarding schools in Maharashtra
Education in Satara district
Panchgani
Educational institutions established in 1902
1902 establishments in India